International Auto Show may refer to one of these auto shows:


Asia
Indonesia International Auto Show
Manila International Auto Show

Canada
Canadian International AutoShow
Montreal International Auto Show

United States
Alabama International Auto Show
First Hawaiian International Auto Show
Memphis International Auto Show
Miami International Auto Show
Nashville International Auto and Truck Show
New York International Auto Show
North American International Auto Show
Portland International Auto Show

See also
International Motor Show (disambiguation)